The Armored Multi-Purpose Vehicle (AMPV) is a U.S. Army program to replace the M113 armored personnel carrier and family of vehicles. AMPV is a sub-project of the Next Generation Combat Vehicle program.

In 2014, the U.S. Army selected BAE Systems' proposal of a turretless variant of the Bradley Fighting Vehicle to replace over 2,800 M113s in service.

, five variants of the AMPV are planned: M1283 General Purpose (522 planned), M1284 Medical Evacuation Vehicle (790 planned), M1285 Medical Treatment Vehicle (216 planned), M1286 Mission Command (993 planned), and M1287 Mortar Carrier Vehicle (386 planned).  the program was scheduled to deliver 2,897 vehicles at a total cost of $10.723 billion, or $3.7 million per vehicle.

The first AMPV prototype was rolled out in December 2016, and the first production vehicles began rolling out in September 2020.

In March 2023, the U.S. Army delivered the first AMPVs to the 1st Armored Brigade Combat Team, 3rd Infantry Division at Fort Stewart, Georgia.

Rationale

The M113 has been in service since the early 1960s and while able to take on various roles, has proven too vulnerable for combat. In the 1980s, the M2 Bradley replaced the M113 in the front-line transport role, moving it to rear-area roles. In the Iraq War, urban warfare tactics still defeated the M113, leading it to be almost entirely replaced in active service by MRAP vehicles. MRAPs were useful on the roads of Iraq, but have less payload capacity and poorer off-road performance. The AMPV aims to find a vehicle more versatile and mobile against a wide range of adversaries while having off-road mobility comparable to Bradleys and M1 Abrams tanks.

Some reports suggested that the AMPV program was being favored over the Ground Combat Vehicle (GCV) program. While procurement of the AMPV fleet would cost over $5 billion, the Government Accountability Office estimates the GCV fleet would cost $37 billion. In April 2013, the Congressional Budget Office said the AMPV would be a better buy because analysts have asserted that the vehicles the GCV is slated to replace should not be first. The GCV was to replace 61 M2 Bradley infantry fighting vehicles in each armored combat brigade, making up 18 percent of the 346 armored combat vehicles in each armored brigade.

A September 2013 Congressional Research Service report suggested that given budgetary constraints, the GCV program may be unrealistic, and that one potential discussion could focus on a decision by the Army to replace the GCV with the AMPV as their number one ground combat vehicle acquisition priority. The Army FY 2015 budget proposal suggests cancelling the GCV program and moving funds to the AMPV as the service's priority vehicle program.

In order to keep development costs down, the Army is requiring the vehicle be a commercial off-the-shelf design that can be incrementally improved. The vehicle would have new technologies including electronics, networking, and communications gear added onto the platform as they become available later. If the AMPV can incorporate newer satellite communications as they are developed, they could be linked to other ground vehicles that would normally require a complete subsystems overhaul for new gear after a certain number of years. The operational maintenance cost requirement of the AMPV is up to $90 per mile, compared to $58 per mile for the M113.

History
In March 2013, the Army issued a draft request for proposals (RFP) for the AMPV. The RFP proposed a $1.46 billion contract for design and development phases. The engineering and manufacturing development (EMD) phase would build 29 prototypes over four years from 2014 through 2017 for $388 million. Low-rate initial production (LRIP) would be from 2018 to 2020 at $1.08 billion for 289 production models. After 2020, the Army planned to buy another 2,618 vehicles over ten years for a total of 2,907 AMPVs. Cost per vehicle is not to exceed $1.8 million, totalling $4.7 billion for the entire fleet. As with the revised GCV program, one development contract will be awarded to one company.

In October 2013, the Army released a new draft RFP, delaying the start of the program by one year and raising the development costs by several hundred million dollars. The new document said the Army planned to award a five-year EMD contract in May 2014 to one contractor, which will manufacture 29 vehicles for government testing, followed by a three-year LRIP contract starting in 2020. The EMD phase was extended from FY 2015 to FY 2019, and raised the cost to build 29 prototypes to $458 million.

Expenditures for three years of LRIP for 289 vehicles were $244 million the first year, $479 million the second year, and $505 million the third year, totaling an increase to $1.2 billion for low-rate production. The AMPV will cost $1.68 billion before full-rate production begins, an increase from $1.46 billion previously. The new draft did not change the total number of vehicles desired and does not include an average unit manufacturing cost. Congress approved $116 million for the program in the Army's FY 2014 budget.

The AMPV has a relatively long production schedule for a non-developmental vehicle of 13 years: 3 years for low-rate production and 10 years for full-rate production. The production plan was partly based on budgetary constraints, but also to be able to speed up production in the event of war or another contingency. 33 percent of an Armored Brigade Combat Team (ABCT) is made up of M113s, which are not used in combat operations because they are less mobile and poorly protected than other combat vehicles in an ABCT. Full-rate production should build just under 300 AMPV vehicles per year, but the ability is there to quickly increase production if an ABCT needed to deploy to combat. Letting industry build as fast as possible regularly only to stop it later is seen as irresponsible.

In November 2013, the Army released the official AMPV EMD phase RFP. Despite sequestration budget cuts, the program is maintaining its previously stated goal of 2,907 vehicles at $1.8 million each, built over 13 years. A 5-year EMD contract was to be awarded to one manufacturer in May 2014 to produce 29 vehicles for testing, which will be followed by a 3-year LRIP contract in 2020. Although the October draft RFP raised the cost of the EMD phase to $458 million, the official November RFP lowered it to $436 million. 

Annual expenditures for the EMD phase are $70 million in FY 2015, $174 million in FY 2016, $114 million in FY 2017, $64 million in FY 2018, and $14 million in FY 2019. The RFP also contains an Optional Exchange Vehicle (OEV) program to exchange up to 78 vehicles during the EMD phase for AMPVs. 39 Bradley vehicles of versions previous to the current M2A3/M3A3 configurations and 39 M113s not including the M113 AMEV can be exchanged by the government to the contractor for credit.

RFP issues
In February 2014, General Dynamics filed a protest with the Army Materiel Command on grounds that the AMPV requirements had been written to favor a chassis based on the BAE Systems Bradley Fighting Vehicle, making it more difficult for their Stryker designs or other foreign designs to compete in the program. They cite the option of using excess Bradleys as optional exchange vehicles, which is difficult for a competitor not offering the chassis, the Army not providing performance data on Bradley components outside of BAE, which they could use to develop a tracked offering, and mobility requirements that exclude wheeled vehicles, which call for a vehicle that can go 100 percent of places the M113 is able to, including very soft ground.

BAE said the Army's changed mobility requirements from a zero turning radius to a larger turning radius that could accommodate a wheeled design and that requirements do not specify a Bradley-based vehicle because a pure Bradley solution would not meet them; the AMPV's survivability requirements are higher than that of an M2 equipped with the Bradley Urban Survival Kit (BUSK) III. Navistar Defense also offered its MaxxPro MRAP to fulfill part of the AMPV role. The idea is to replace the M113 sooner with the more survivable mine-resistant MaxxPro until the AMPV can be fielded in 2020. 

The Army Materiel Command denied General Dynamics' protest in April 2014. Their response was that although BAE had an advantage being the manufacturers of the Bradley and M113, the government was not required to neutralize that and that does not constitute preferential treatment. Regarding OEVs, the Army Materiel Command clarified that they may not specifically be used for conversion but could still be exchanged for foreign sales or be scrapped, which would be less cost-effective. General Dynamics could have gone to the Government Accountability Office with its protest, or simply withdraw from the competition.

In April 2014, General Dynamics released a statement saying they wouldn't file a protest with the GAO, but would still be engaged in talks with Congress and the Department of Defense. The company may believe it has a better chance of gaining support through Congress, which favors a strategy of buying a mix of both Stryker and Bradley vehicles, and would be less likely to act if the dispute was brought to the GAO to avoid affecting the outcome of the protest. AMPV proposals were due by 28 May 2014. 

General Dynamics also favors the mixed Bradley/Stryker AMPV acquisition idea, saying a combination fleet would match missions with Bradley and Double V-hull (DVH) Stryker strengths to quickly provide enhanced survivability and lower logistics costs. The Stryker M1135 NBC Reconnaissance Vehicle is already organic within ABCTs, and the M1133 Medical Evacuation Vehicle deployed with an ABCT to Iraq in 2009.

Using the wheeled Stryker to perform some AMPV missions would offset costs associated with maintaining tracked vehicles. A company analysis concluded that a mixed fleet would save billions of dollars through lower life-cycle costs compared to one fleet of either solution. The Stryker family of vehicles already includes all AMPV versions, except medical treatment, so "up-front" availability of those vehicles would shorten development timelines and allow the M113 to be replaced quicker.

In May 2014, the House Armed Services Committee Tactical Air and Land Forces Subcommittee passed its markup of the FY 2015 budget. Language pertaining to the AMPV approved 80 percent of requested funding, but withheld 20 percent until the Army submitted a report on the program by May 2015. The report requests a study on replacing M113 vehicles in formations separate from frontline fighting, rather than just in armored brigades, and the feasibility of a wheeled vehicle being used for the medical evacuation role. This works into General Dynamics' suggestion of a split buy, using tracked Bradley-type vehicles for mobility missions while having wheeled Strykers as an armored ambulance and for support vehicle missions not assigned to combat brigades.

Although a split buy may be considered, with lower-mobility vehicles serving in rear-echelon units outside of armored brigades, the Army is unlikely to procure a mix of tracked and wheeled armored vehicles within an ABCT itself due to risk of mobility differences hindering cross-country maneuvering and mechanical differences increasing maintenance demands. General Dynamics claims that using the Stryker medical evacuation vehicle would save $2 billion in life cycle costs and that it is smoother and quicker than a tracked vehicle in the role.

Vehicle submissions

In May 2014, BAE Systems submitted their proposal for the AMPV competition. Their submission was based on the Bradley and Paladin Integrated Management designs to meet the force protection and all-terrain mobility requirements with maximum commonality within the family of vehicles. The BAE AMPV team includes: DRS Technologies for power management, distribution, and integration; Northrop Grumman for Mission Command Mission Equipment Package design and integration; Air Methods Corporation for medical evacuation and treatment subsystems; and the Red River Army Depot for vehicle teardown and component remanufacture.

A 52-month EMD contract was to be awarded in January 2015, with prototypes delivered after 24 months. General Dynamics did not make a submission, saying they would not compete in the program as the requirements and other provisions did not allow them to provide a competitive solution. The company ruled out bringing their protest to the Federal Circuit Court so they could pursue other options, including their mixed fleet idea to include Stryker medical vehicles.

The Senate Appropriations Committee may include language in its 2015 defense appropriations bill that prohibits the Army from funding the medical evacuation variant of the AMPV. This is due to lobbying from General Dynamics to Congress in order to get the Stryker incorporated into future Army vehicle plans, with the Senate claiming time and funding may be wasted on developing a new medical evacuation variant when "a wheeled combat vehicle has successfully deployed in combat with armored brigade combat teams," referencing Stryker medical vehicles deployed with some heavy brigades in Iraq. The Army said that this would require them to compete that part of the program separately, write a new RFP, and come up with a new acquisition strategy, independent cost estimate, and acquisition decision memorandum. This could potentially cost an additional $95 million, delay the program at least two years, and would take money away from Abrams, Bradley, and Stryker modernization efforts.

EMD
In December 2014, BAE Systems was awarded a $383 million contract to begin the Engineering, Manufacturing, and Development (EMD) phase of the AMPV program. The initial award is for a 52-month base term, to produce 29 vehicles across each of the variants. It contains the option to begin Low-Rate Initial Production (LRIP) immediately following the EMD's conclusion to produce an additional 289 vehicles for the total contract value of $1.2 billion.

The vehicles are to move as rapidly as the primary combat vehicles in an ABCT during unified land operations over multiple terrain sets with superior force protection, survivability, and mobility than the M113. They will support the M1 Abrams and M2/M3 Bradley to resupply the formation, conduct battle command functions, deliver organic indirect fires, provide logistics support and medical treatment, and perform medical and casualty evacuation to function as an integral part of the ABCT formation.

Army leaders have rejected General Dynamics' idea of using a wheeled vehicle for medical evacuation in armored brigades, saying a tracked vehicle's superior mobility better enables it to retrieve wounded soldiers. The requirements were for a vehicle that could go wherever the tracked vehicles of an armored brigade went, which would include rough terrain and soft ground that a wheeled vehicle could get bogged down in, preventing an armored ambulance from reaching wounded soldiers in time. Using BAE's Bradley-based chassis allows for commonality between 75 percent of an armored brigade's combat vehicles, easing maintenance and logistics and ensuring the vehicles have comparable mobility.

Variants

There are to be five versions of the AMPV:

XM1283 General Purpose (GP): Replaces the M113A3 APC. Requirements are for 2 crew and 6 troops, be configured to carry one litter, and mount a crew served weapon. Tasks include conducting logistics package escort, emergency resupply, casualty evacuation, and security for medical evacuation. 522 planned.
XM1284 Medical Evacuation Vehicle (MEV): Replaces the M113 AMEV. Requirements are for 3 crew and able to have either 6 ambulatory patients, 4 litter patients, or 3 ambulatory patients and 2 litter patients. It must also have medical equipment sets and environmental cooling. Tasks include conducting medical evacuation from the point of injury to an aid station and medical resupply replenishment. 790 planned.
XM1285 Medical Treatment Vehicle (MTV): Replaces the M577A3 Medical Vehicle. Requirements are for 4 crew and one litter patient, as well as medical equipment sets and environmental cooling. Tasks include serving as the forward aid station, main aid station, and battalion aid station. 216 planned.
XM1287 Mortar Carrier Vehicle (MCV): Replaces the M1064A3 Mortar Carrier. Requirements are for 2 crew and 2 mortar crew, with a 120 mm mortar and 69 mortar rounds. The task is to provide indirect mortar fire. 386 planned.
XM1286 Mission Command (MCmd): Replaces the M1068A3 Command Post Carrier. Requirements are for 2 crew, 2 operators, and a mount for a crew served weapon. The task is to serve as a command post. 993 planned.
Engineer Vehicle: An internal BAE project in collaboration with the US Army to develop an engineer vehicle to replace M113's in that role at Echelons Above Brigade (EAB).

Competitors
BAE Systems Turretless Bradley – BAE is offering a turretless version of their Bradley Fighting Vehicle.
General Dynamics Stryker – General Dynamics was offering a tracked version of their Stryker APC, but then offered the wheeled version of the Stryker.
Navistar Defense Maxxpro – Navistar was offering a modified version of their wheeled MaxxPro MRAP.

See also
Interim Armored Vehicle, a U.S. Army combat vehicle program that resulted in the acquisition of the Stryker family
Ground Combat Vehicle, a U.S. Army infantry fighting vehicle acquisition program canceled in 2014
Joint Light Tactical Vehicle, a U.S. armed forces acquisition program to replace the Humvee
Optionally Manned Fighting Vehicle, an ongoing U.S. Army infantry fighting vehicle program to replace the M2 Bradley

References

External links

 BAE Systems Armored Multi-Purpose Vehicle web page

Post–Cold War armored fighting vehicles of the United States
Future American vehicles
United States Army projects
Military vehicles introduced in the 2020s
Armored personnel carriers of the United States